WMVN (100.3 MHz, "96.5/100.3 The Beat") is a rhythmic top 40 FM radio station serving the Syracuse and a part of the Utica-Rome, New York market. WMVN is licensed to Sylvan Beach, New York. A separate translator, W243AB, serves the city of Syracuse, New York on the 96.5 frequency (hence the "96.5/100.3 The Beat" branding). The station is located at 401 West Kirkpatrick St, in Syracuse, NY.

History

As Radio Disney
WMVN signed on in 1999 as WBGJ, as a simulcast of the Radio Disney affiliated sister stations WOLF and WWLF.

As "Movin'"
In October 2006, the station changed its call sign to WWLF-FM. On December 6, 2006, the station flipped its format to Rhythmic Adult Contemporary, becoming the tenth station to adopt the MOViN' format, along with sister station WOLF-FM (96.7). The AM stations continued to carry Radio Disney programming through 2014.

In August 2009, WWLF-FM and WOLF-FM changed their call signs to WMVU (100.3) and WMVN (96.7). This allowed sister station FM 105.1 to adopt the WOLF-FM call letters, as it transitioned to a country music format known as "The Wolf." The WMVN call sign had been available since January 2009, when the current WXOS in St. Louis, Missouri abandoned the Movin' format and thus the call sign.

On November 30, 2009, WMVU and WMVN (the WMVN calls moving to 100.3) split their simulcast, with 96.7 flipping to country, simulcasting WOLF-FM 105.1 FM DeRuyter, NY, with new calls WWLF-FM.

As "The Beat"
On November 9, 2016, WMVN began stunting with the sound of a heartbeat and liners promoting a change at 4 p.m. on that date. At that time, WMVN flipped to Rhythmic CHR as "96.5/100.3 The Beat". The first song on The Beat was "No Problem" by Chance the Rapper.

In late 2017, WMVN began HD radio broadcasts. It also began simulcasting sister stations WSEN and WOLF-FM on its HD2 and HD3 subchannels, respectively.

Previous logo

References

External links
96.5 The Beat's website
MOViN' 100.3 & 96.5's MySpace
WOLF 1490 Tribute Site

MVN
Rhythmic contemporary radio stations in the United States
Radio stations established in 2001